Ozaena is a genus of beetles in the family Carabidae, containing the following species:

 Ozaena boucheri Deuve, 2001 
 Ozaena convexa Banninger, 1927 
 Ozaena dentipes Olivier, 1812 
 Ozaena ecuadorica Banninger, 1949 
 Ozaena elevata Banninger, 1956 
 Ozaena grossa Banninger, 1927 
 Ozaena lemoulti Banninger, 1932 
 Ozaena linearis Banninger, 1927 
 Ozaena manu Ball & Shpeley, 1990 
 Ozaena martinezi Ogueta, 1965 
 Ozaena maxi Ball & Shpeley, 1990

References

Paussinae